Kosambari or koshambari is a typical south Indian salad made from pulses (split legumes) and seasoned with mustard seeds. The pulses generally used are split Green gram (Hesaru bele in Kannada). These salads are sometimes eaten as snacks, but usually as a part of full course meal.

Ingredients
Generally kosambari is made of green gram, grated coconut,  coriander and chili. Optionally grated carrot or finely cut cucumber can be mixed. Oil, mustard, curry leaves, asafoetida for seasoning.

Preparation
Soak green gram for two hours. Grate coconut and carrot. Finely cut cucumber can be used too. Chop coriander, chilli. During mango season unripe mango can be grated and added. Totapuri (mango) goes well with kosambari. 
Seasoning: Heat oil in a small pan, add mustard, asafoetida (optional) and curry leaf. Let the seasoning cool down. Mix all the ingredients along with salt for taste.

Tradition
Kosambari is distributed during festivals and on special occasions. It is distributed to masses during Ganesha Chaturthi and Sri Rama Navami.
During Varamahalakshmi and Gowri festivals women invite each other and exchange kosambari along with turmeric and vermilion to
celebrate divinity in the feminine.

Gallery

See also
 List of salads

References

Karnataka cuisine
Indian legume dishes
Salads
Vegetable dishes